is a Japanese ornamental tile set on both ends of the ridgepole that tops a shingled roof. The kanji for the word mean "kite" and "tail" respectively.

Shibi often take the form of a shachihoko.

See also
Shisa, ceramic lions on roofs or by gates
Chinese roof charms, multiple different species
Chiwen, origin of Shibi in China

References
Much of the content of this article comes from the equivalent Japanese-language version (accessed April 1, 2006).

Japanese architectural features
Roof tiles